Mer de Glace: opera in two acts with prologue was written 1986–1991 by Australian composer Richard Meale with a libretto by David Malouf. It is an adaptation of, and commentary on, Mary Shelley's novel Frankenstein. It presents a tableaux-like juxtaposition of some ideas of the novel Frankenstein alongside the real dealings of Mary Shelley with Percy Bysshe Shelley and Lord Byron..

Performances
The first performance was given under Dobbs Franks at the Sydney Opera House 3 October 1991. The cast was David Collins-White in the dual part of Shelley/Frankenstein; Kerry Elizabeth Brown as Mary Shelley; Linda Thompson as Claire Clairemont; Lyndon Terracini as Lord Byron/The Monster; and Dominic Natoli as the Tourist Guide. They were accomapnied by the chorus of the Australian Opera and the orchestra of the Australian Opera and Ballet.

Recording 
A complete recording of the 1991 performance broadcast live on Australian Broadcasting Commission FM is available on YouTube.

On the ABC 1995 recording Richard Meale: Viridian/Symphony No. 1/Scenes from Mer de Glace, played by the Adelaide Symphony Orchestra conducted by David Porcelijn are four scenes from Mer de Glace: 1. On the Mer de Glace; 2. Prelude – Lake Geneva; 3. Village Dance; 4. Mary Shelley's Nightmare.

On the 2009 ABC recording Richard Meale: Cantilena Pacifica is a performance of Concert monologue from Mer de Glace by soprano Merlyn Quaife and the Tasmanian Symphony Orchestra conducted by Richard Mills.

References

English-language operas
1986 operas
Operas
Operas by Richard Meale
Operas set in Australia
Operas based on novels
Opera world premieres at the Adelaide Festival Theatre